The following is a discography of Japanese noise group .

Studio albums

Live albums

Compilation albums

Box sets

EPs

Splits

Video albums

Compilation tracks

Promos

References

Electronic music discographies
Discographies of Japanese artists